Malene Marquard Olsen (born 2 February 1983) is a retired Danish football defender. She lastly played for Elitedivisionen club Brøndby IF and has also played for the Danish national team.

Olsen began her club career at Hedehusene IK. As of September 2012, Olsen had made the second most appearances for Brøndby with 247. Only Mia Brogaard had more with 327.

In 2009 Olsen played for Swedish club Tyresö FF, while working as a nurse in Stockholm.

Olsen made her debut for the senior Denmark national team in February 2003; a 4–0 defeat to Norway in La Manga Club. In October 2011 Olsen was recalled to the national team after a five-year absence, for a UEFA European Championship 2013 qualifying tie with Austria. She was named in national coach Kenneth Heiner-Møller's squad for the final tournament, where Denmark reached the semi-finals. Olsen retired from football in June 2014.

References

External links
Danish Football Union (DBU) statistics

1983 births
Living people
Danish women's footballers
Denmark women's international footballers
Danish nurses
Tyresö FF players
Brøndby IF (women) players
Association football defenders
Women's association football defenders
Denmark women's youth international footballers